Siu-Fong Lai is a Chinese actress from Hong Kong. Lai has over 25 film credits.

Career 
In 1965, Lai began her acting career. Lai appeared in My Darling Wife, a 1965 drama film directed by Chan Wan. Lai is known for a role in Old Master Q, a 1975 comedy film directed by Lee Tit, Chu Yat-Hung, King Weng. Lai is Mrs. Mok in The Private Eyes, a 1976 comedy film directed by Michael Hui. Lai appeared as Cheung Dai Ma in The Secret, a 1979 thriller drama and first feature film directed by Ann Hui. Lai's last films were Something Incredible - Dead Deadlock, a 1992 film and Stuntmen, a 1992 drama film directed by Yuen Shu-Wai. Lai has over 25 film credits.

Filmography

Films 
 1965 Love of A Pedicab Man (aka The Love of a Rickshaw Coolie)
 1965 My Darling Wife
 1965 Gong zi duo qing - Siu Nai
 1965 A Secluded Orchid by the Sea - Mother Lee
 1966 The Lonely Woman
 1966 Love Burst - Third Aunt 
 1966 The Story Between Hong Kong and Macau - Mrs Luk/Hung Mui's landlady
 1966 	A Spring Celebration of the Swallows' Return - Kwan Sing-To's wife
 1966 Who's the Real Murderer? - Yeung Ka-Fai's wife
 1966 But How Cruel You Are 	 	 
 1966 To Marry a Ghost
 1967 Family Man 
 1967 The Divorce Brinkmanship 
 1972 Four Girls from Hong Kong
 1975 Old Master Q
 1976 The 76 Humors II
 1976 The Private Eyes - Mrs. Mok 
 1978 Chameleon 
 1978 Lam Ah Chun 
 1978 For Whom to Be Murdered 
 1979 One Way Only
 1979 The Secret - Cheung Dai-Ma. Note: First featured film directed by Ann Hui.
 1981 Charlie's Bubble
 1986 Parking Service - Uncle Kau's wife
 1987 People's Hero - Bank customer 
 1988 How to Pick Girls Up - Jenny's Aunt
 1992 Stuntmen
 1992 Something Incredible - Dead Deadlock

References

External links 
 Lai Siu Fong at china-underground.com
 Lai Siu-fong at senscritique.com
 Lai Sui Fong at hkcinemagic.com
 Sui-Fong Lai at imdb.com

Hong Kong film actresses
Living people
Year of birth missing (living people)